Manneh may refer to the following people:

Mane people
Alasana Manneh (born 1998), Gambian footballer
Awa Manneh (born 1982), Swedish R&B/soul singer 
Ebrima Manneh, Gambian journalist 
Fatou Jaw-Manneh, Gambian journalist and activist 
Kekuta Manneh (born 1994), Gambian football striker 
Lamin Manneh, United Nations officials from Gambia
Maad a Sinig Maysa Wali Jaxateh Manneh, 14th century African king
Ousman Manneh (born 1997), Gambian football striker 
Kalifa Manneh (born 1998), Gambian football winger